A Venus figurine is any Upper Palaeolithic statuette portraying a woman, usually carved in the round. Most have been unearthed in Europe, but others have been found as far away as Siberia, and distributed across much of Eurasia.

Most date from the Gravettian period (26,000–21,000 years ago). However, findings are not limited to this period; for example, the Venus of Hohle Fels dates back at least 35,000 years to the Aurignacian era, and the Venus of Monruz dates back about 11,000 years to the Magdalenian. Such figurines were carved from soft stone (such as steatite, calcite or limestone), bone or ivory, or formed of clay and fired. The latter are among the oldest ceramics known to historians. These figurines are recognised as some of the earliest works of prehistoric art.

Most have wide hips and legs that taper to a point. Arms and feet are often absent, and the head is usually small and faceless. Various figurines exaggerate the abdomen, hips, breasts, thighs, or vulva, although many found examples do not reflect these typical characteristics. Depictions of hairstyles can be detailed, and especially in Siberian examples, clothing or tattoos may be indicated.

The original cultural meaning and purpose of these artefacts is not known. It has frequently been suggested that they may have served a ritual or symbolic function. There are widely varying and speculative interpretations of their use or meaning: they have been seen as religious figures, an expression of health and fertility, grandmother goddesses, or as self-depictions by female artists.

History of discovery 
The Vénus impudique, which was the figurine that gave the whole category its name, was the first Palaeolithic sculptural representation of a woman to be discovered in modern times. It was found in 1864 by Paul Hurault, 8th Marquis de Vibraye at Laugerie-Basse in the Vézère valley. This valley is one of the many important Stone Age sites in and around the commune of Les Eyzies-de-Tayac-Sireuil in Dordogne, southwestern France. The figurines were mostly discovered in settlement contexts, both in open-air sites and caves. The Magdalenian Venus from Laugerie-Basse is headless, footless, armless, and displays a strongly emphasised female reproductive system.

Four years later, Salomon Reinach published an article about a group of soapstone figurines from the caves of Balzi Rossi. The famous Venus of Willendorf was excavated in 1908 from a loess deposit in the Danube valley located in Austria. Since then, hundreds of similar figurines have been discovered from the Pyrenees Mountains to the plains of Siberia.

In September 2008, archaeologists from the University of Tübingen discovered a  figurine carved from a mammoth's tusk. This figurine was later called the Venus of Hohle Fels and can be dated to at least 35,000 years ago. It represents the earliest known sculpture of this type and the earliest known work of figurative art.

Name 
Upper Palaeolithic female figurines are collectively described as "Venus figurines" in reference to the Roman goddess of beauty Venus.  The name was first used in the mid-nineteenth century by the Marquis de Vibraye, who discovered an ivory figurine and named it La Vénus impudique or Venus Impudica ("immodest Venus"). The Marquis then contrasted the ivory figurine to the Aphrodite Of Knidos, a Greco-Roman sculpture depicting Venus covering her naked body with both her hands.  In the early 20th century, the general belief among scholars was that the figurines represent an ancient ideal of beauty.  Since their discovery, considerable diversity in opinion amongst archeologists and in paleoanthropological literature has arisen as to the function and significance of the figures.  Most scholars that have differing opinions on the purpose of the figurines, such as anthropologist Randall White, also disapprove of the "Venus" name as a result.

The use of the name is metaphorical as there is no link between the ancient figurines and the Roman goddess Venus; although they have been interpreted as representations of a primordial female goddess. This perception is said to have derived from the fact that attention is directed to certain features common to most of the figurines, in particular emotionally charged primary and secondary sexual characteristics such as the breasts, stomachs and buttocks. The term has been criticised for being a reflection of modern Western ideas rather than reflecting the beliefs of the sculptures' original owners, but the original names are unknown as well, so the term Venus has persisted.

Like many prehistoric artefacts, the exact cultural meaning of these figures may never be known. Archaeologists speculate, however, that they may be symbolic of security and success, fertility, or a mother goddess. The female figures are a part of Upper Palaeolithic art, specifically the category of Palaeolithic art known as portable art.

Figure details 

The majority of Venus figurines are depictions of women, and follow artistic conventions of the times. Most of the figurines display the same body shape with the widest point at the abdomen and the female reproductive organs exaggerated. Oftentimes other details, such as the head and limbs, are neglected or absent which leads the figure to be abstracted to the point of simplicity. The heads are often of relatively small size and devoid of detail. Some may represent pregnant women, while others show no indication of pregnancy.

The Venus of Willendorf and the Venus of Laussel (a rock relief rather than a figurine) bear traces of having been externally covered in red ochre. The significance of this is not clear, but is traditionally assumed to be religious or ritual in nature. Some human bodies from the Palaeolithic era are found similarly covered, so it is assumed this colour had a significant meaning in their culture even though we do not know what.

All generally accepted Palaeolithic female figurines are from the Upper Palaeolithic. Although they were originally mostly considered part of the Aurignacian culture, the majority are now associated with the Gravettian and Solutrean cultures. In these periods, the more rotund figurines are predominant. Within the Magdalenian cultures, the forms become finer with more detail and the styling of said figures started to become similar within areas of close contact.

Interpretation

Despite being thought as one of the most 'fertile sources of debate in all of archeology', Venus figurines appear to be relatively unstudied as a whole. The consequences of this is that they have fallen victim to generalised stereotypes that fail to acknowledge morphological variation and differing contexts.

Nevertheless, there has still been many differing interpretations of the figurines since their discovery - one of which comes from Helen Benigni. In her book, Emergence of the Goddess, she argues that the consistency in design of these featureless, large-breasted, often pregnant figures throughout a wide region and over a long period of time suggests they represent an archetype of a female Supreme Creator. Neolithic, Bronze Age, and Iron Age inhabitants likely connected women as creators innately tied to the cycles of nature. Through this, it was believed that women's birth and menstrual cycles aligned with lunar cycles and tides.

One interpretation came from McCoid and McDermott who suggested that because of the way these figures are depicted, such as the large breasts and lack of feet and faces, these statues were made by women looking at their own bodies. They suggest that women during the period would not have had access to mirrors to maintain accurate proportions. This theory also provides an explanation as to why many of the Venus figures do not have faces or heads, as the creators would need mirrors to do so. However, Michael S. Bisson critiqued this theory by suggesting that alternatives, such as puddles, could have been used as mirrors.

It has been suggested that they may be a sign of an earlier prevalence of steatopygia, now associated principally to women of certain African or Andamanese ancestry.
However the Venuses do not qualify as steatopygian, since they exhibit an angle of approximately 120 degrees between the back and the buttocks, while steatopygia is diagnosed by modern medical standards at an angle of about 90 degrees only.

Another modern interpretation, providing an explanation for visible weight variety amongst the figurines, comes from Johnson et al. Here, they argue that differences in the statues can be said to relate to human adaption to climate change. This is because figurines that are seen to be obese or pregnant originate to the earlier art from 38,000 to 14,000 BP - a period where nutritional stress arose as a result of falling temperatures. Accordingly, they found a correlation between an increase in distance from glacial fronts and a decrease in obesity of the figurines. This was justified as survival and reproduction, in glacial, colder areas, required sufficient nutrition and, consequently, over-nourished woman may have been seen as the ideal of beauty in these areas.

Later female figurines and continuity 

Some scholars suggest a direct continuity between Palaeolithic female figurines and later examples of female depictions from the Neolithic or Bronze Age.

A female figurine which has 'no practical use and is portable' and has the common elements of a Venus figurine (a strong accent or exaggeration of female sex linked traits, and the lack of complete lower limbs) may be considered to be a Venus figurine, even if archaeological evidence suggests it was produced after the main Palaeolithic period. Some figurines matching this definition originate from the Neolithic era and into the Bronze Age. The period and location in which a figurine was produced helps guide archaeologists to reach conclusions as to whether the art piece found can be defined as a Venus figurine or not. For example, ceramic figurines from the late ceramic Neolithic may be accepted as Venus figurines, while stone figurines from later periods are not. This is a matter of ongoing debate given the strong similarity between many figurines from the Palaeolithic, Neolithic and beyond. A reworked endocast of a brachiopod from around 6000 BCE in Norway has been identified as a late Venus figurine.

This means that a given female figurine may or may not be classified as a Venus figure by any given archaeologist, regardless of its date, though most archaeologists disqualify figurines which date later than the Palaeolithic, even though their purpose could have been the same.

Notable figurines

See also

 List of Stone Age art
 Matriarchal religion
 When God Was a Woman
 Feminine beauty ideal

Notes

References
 Beck, Margaret, in Ratman, Alison E. (ed.), Reading the Body: Representations and Remains in the Archaeological Record, 2000, University of Pennsylvania Press, 9780812217094, google books
 Cook, Jill, Venus figurines, Video with Dr Jill Cook, Curator of European Prehistory, British Museum
 Fagan, Brian M., Beck, Charlotte, "Venus Figurines", The Oxford Companion to Archaeology, 1996, Oxford University Press, 9780195076189, google books
 Sandars, Nancy K. (1968), Prehistoric Art in Europe. Penguin: Pelican, now Yale, History of Art. (nb 1st ed.)

Further reading
 Abramova, Z. (1962). Paleolitičeskoe iskusstvo na territorii SSSR, Moskva : Akad. Nauk SSSR, Inst. Archeologii
 Abramova, Z. (1995). L'Art paléolithique d'Europe orientale et de Sibérie., Grenoble: Jérôme Millon.
 Cohen, C. (2003). La femme des origines - images de la femme dans la préhistoire occidentale, Belin - Herscher. 
 
 Cook, Jill. (2013). Ice Age Art: the Arrival of the Modern Mind; London: British Museum Press. 
 Delporte, Henri. (1993). L'image de la femme dans l'art préhistorique, éd. Picard.
 
 Gvozdover, M. (1995).: Art of the mammoth hunters: the finds from Avdeevo, (Oxbow Monograph 49), Oxford: Oxbow.
 Power, C. (2004). "Women in prehistoric art". In G. Berghaus (ed.), New Perspectives in Prehistoric Art. Westport, CT & London: Praeger, pp. 75–104.
 
 
 Rau, S., Naumann D., Barth M., Mühleis Y., Bleckmann C. (2009): Eiszeit: Kunst und Kultur, Thorbecke.

External links

 Venus figures from the Stone Age - with excellent pictures of most of the figurines
 Undergraduate thesis, University of Texas, PDF
 Christopher Witcombe, "Analysis of the Venus of Willendorf"
 (Canadian Museum of Civilization) The Balzi Rossi Figurines

 
Archaeological artefact types
Prehistoric sculpture
Stone Age Europe
Upper Paleolithic
Prehistoric art
Women and sexuality
Sexuality in arts
Female beauty